The Eastern Shawnee Tribe of Oklahoma is one of three federally recognized Shawnee tribes. They are located in Oklahoma and Missouri.

The tribe holds an annual powwow every September at their tribal complex.

Government
The headquarters of the Eastern Shawnee Tribe are Wyandotte, Oklahoma, and their tribal jurisdictional area is in Ottawa County, Oklahoma. There are 3,779 enrolled tribal members, and 904 of them living within the state of Oklahoma. Some live nearby in Missouri, where the tribe has a Cultural Preservation Center at Seneca, Missouri and a community in western Missouri.

Glenna J. Wallace is the elected chief, since 2006, and is currently serving a four-year term. She is the tribe's first female chief.  The Eastern Shawnee Tribe issues its own tribal vehicle tags.

Membership in tribe is based on documented lineal descent to persons listed on the Dawes Rolls. The tribe has no minimum blood quantum requirements.

Economic development
The Eastern Shawnee Tribe operate their own housing authority. They own 51% of the shares in the People's Bank of Seneca, Missouri; the Eastern Shawnee Tribe owns a Print Shop;  Four Feathers Recycling; as well as three casinos, a hotel, a bingo hall, a gas station, a truck stop, and an off-track wagering facility. Their annual economic impact is estimated by the Oklahoma Indian Affairs Commissions to be $164,000,000.

History
The Eastern Shawnee Tribe of Oklahoma are primarily descendants of Shawnees who lived in Ohio until the 1830s. The Shawnees, an Eastern Woodland tribe who were once nomadic,  occupied territory throughout what became the eastern United States, living in present-day Ohio, Virginia, West Virginia, Western Maryland, Kentucky, and Pennsylvania. In the late 18th century, European-American encroachment crowded Shawnee lands in the east, and one band migrated to Missouri, eventually becoming the Absentee Shawnee tribe. 

Three reservations were granted to the Shawnees in Ohio by the 1817 Treaty of Fort Meigs: Wapakoneta, Lewistown, and Hog Creek. After the Indian Removal Act of 1830 passed, the Lewiston band, who lived with a group of Senecas, relocated to Indian Territory in July 1831, and were known as the "Mixed Band" of Senecas and Shawnees. Another band, who would become the federally recognized Shawnee Tribe, relocated to Kansas in August 1831.

The US federal government carved out a  reservation for the "Mixed Band" or United Nation of Senecas and Shawnees from Cherokee lands in Indian Territory in 1832. A treaty was negotiated between the US and the Seneca and Shawnee in 1867, which made portions of their land available to other tribes, and restored the independence of the Seneca and Shawnee tribes. They were from different language families, Iroquoian and Algonquian, respectively. The Shawnees of the "Mixed Band" became the Eastern Shawnee Tribe. The Eastern Shawnee organized as a federally recognized tribe under the 1936 Oklahoma Indian Welfare Act.

In May 2019, the Eastern Shawnee ceremonial grounds flooded with three feet of water. Thirty families were evacuated, and "local roads stayed impassable for weeks." Mold problems have been ongoing. Tribal leaders have joined the city of Miami in opposition to increased water levels at Pensacola Dam and Grand Lake. They argue that when the water backs up downstream on the Neosho River, it can increase problems with flooding in their communities.

Flag
The tribe's flag displays their tribal seal on a red field, with the name of the tribe in black letters. The seal, resembling a warrior's shield, features a Florida panther. Beside expressing ingenuity and fierceness, the panther represents Tecumseh, a great Shawnee leader. A spear bisects the seal and below is a swan, which represents peace, harmony, and beauty. The four eagle feathers represent the four directions; originally five feathers were on the flag, representing the five original Shawnee tribal divisions.

Notable Eastern Shawnee people 
 J. R. Conrad (1974–), National Football League player
 Moscelyne Larkin (1925–2012), ballerina
 Taylor M. Wright (1993–), U.S. Army Officer
 Thomas Captain Chief  (1850 - 1920)
 Thomas A Captain Chief (1884 - 1980)

See also

Shawnee language
Stomp dance

Notes

External links
Eastern Shawnee Tribe of Oklahoma, official website
 Constitution of the Eastern Shawnee Tribe of Oklahoma
Almost Home, Eastern Shawnee makes an Ohio Connection Native American Times 9 September 2012

 
Algonquian peoples
Native American tribes in Oklahoma
Federally recognized tribes in the United States